Kirby was an unincorporated community in Big Horn County, Montana, United States. The site is on the west bank of Rosebud Creek. Rosebud Battlefield State Park lies approximately twelve miles south of the community, just west of Rosebud Creek.

History

The town site of Kirby was at Montana Highway 314 and Cache Creek Road. It was directly east of the Crow Indian Reservation and south of the Northern Cheyenne Indian Reservation in the Rosebud Creek valley. A post office was operational from 1895 until 1970 with the ZIP Code of 59042.

Kirby is a ghost town with no more than a couple remaining buildings, including the former post office.

References

Unincorporated communities in Big Horn County, Montana
Unincorporated communities in Montana